Abdullah Maute (died August 7, 2017) was a Moro militant who co-founded, along with his brother Omar Maute, a Dawlah Islamiyah (Islamic state) group in Mindanao, Philippines commonly known as the Maute group after their surname.

On September 4, 2017, the Philippine military announced that Maute had been killed in an airstrike in August 7, 2017 during the Battle of Marawi. They cited ISIL sympathizers proclaiming his death as an act of martyrdom on the social media platform Telegram. He was referred to as "Sheik Al Miyahad Abu Al Hassan", an alias he was known to have used within the ISIL network. AFP Western Mindanao Command chief Carlito Galvez Jr. confirmed deaths of all seven Maute brothers in December 2017.

Early life and education
Siblings Omar and Abdullah Maute are descended from a Maranao warrior clan based in Butig, Lanao del Sur, the town where they were born and spent their childhood. They were born to Cayamora and Farhana Maute.

The brothers had worked in the Middle East as Overseas Filipino Workers. While working for secular schools in Syria and the United Arab Emirates, the brothers studied Islamic theology. Abdullah reportedly was educated in Jordan.

Militant activity

MILF
Philippine military sources state that the siblings' father, Cayamora Maute, was a senior official of the Moro Islamic Liberation Front (MILF). After the MILF began to engage in peace negotiations with the Philippine government, the brothers criticized the MILF leadership and pledged allegiance to ISIS.

Maute group
The Mautes, according to their relatives, later established connections with Ameril Umbra Kato, the founder of the Bangsamoro Islamic Freedom Fighters (BIFF). The siblings reportedly sent representatives to Kato after the BIFF leader suffered a hypertensive stroke which rendered the left portion of his body paralyzed. After forging ties with Kato, the Mautes established the Maute group. Five other brothers also became involved in the group according to the Philippine military.

Battle of Marawi and death
On June 10, 2017, during the Marawi crisis, the Philippine Army claimed that the Maute brothers had been killed in a firefight, although details were not available. On September 4, 2017, the military announced that Abdullah was killed in August 7, 2017 in an airstrike. They cited ISIL sympathizers proclaiming his death as an act of martyrdom on the social media platform Telegram. He was referred to as "Sheik Al Miyahad Abu Al Hassan", the name he was known to have used within the ISIL network. In September 2017, the military stated that Omar alone among the seven Maute brothers remained alive, as the other six were killed in battle.

AFP Western Mindanao Command chief Lt. Gen. Carlito Galvez Jr. confirmed in December 2017 that all seven Maute brothers had been killed by the Philippine Army.

Personal life
His mother, Ominta Romato Maute, also known as Farhana Maute, has been described by some sources as the financier of the Maute group's activities, providing logistics and recruiting fighters. She was arrested on June 9, 2017, in Lanao del Sur. Her husband, Cayamora Maute, was arrested the day before in Davao City. Cayamora Maute died in August 2017 on the way to Taguig-Pateros District Hospital after experiencing difficulty in breathing.

References

20th-century births
2017 deaths
Filipino Islamists
People from Lanao del Sur
Moro conflict
Leaders of Islamic terror groups
Year of birth missing
Filipino Muslims